The Moore Building is a historic commercial building at 519-23 Center Street in Little Rock, Arkansas.  It is a two-story brick building with Mission Revival styling, designed by Thompson, Sanders & Ginocchio and built in 1929.  It has an orange tile parapet roof, with parapetted corners, and periodic use of decorative tiles and terra cotta panels on its two street-facing facades.

The building was listed on the National Register of Historic Places in 1986.

See also
National Register of Historic Places listings in Little Rock, Arkansas

References

Commercial buildings on the National Register of Historic Places in Arkansas
Mission Revival architecture in Arkansas
Buildings and structures completed in 1929
Buildings and structures in Little Rock, Arkansas
National Register of Historic Places in Little Rock, Arkansas